Aluminé or Alumine can refer to: 

Aluminium
Aluminé (town), a town in Neuquén Province, Argentina 
Aluminé Lake, a lake in Neuquén Province, Argentina
Aluminé River, a river in Neuquén Province, Argentina
Aluminé Department, a department located in the west of Neuquén Province, Argentina.